The following is a list of notable Romanian artists.

Romanian notable artists

 Theodor Aman
 Ion Andreescu
 Corneliu Baba
 Sabin Bălaşa
 Horia Bernea
 Constantin Brâncuși
 Victor Brauner
 Doina Bumbea
 Ștefan Câlția
 Silvia Cambir
 Henri Catargi
 Alexandru Ciucurencu
 Horia Damian
 Eugen Drăguţescu
 Ion Grigorescu
 Lucian Grigorescu
 Nicolae Grigorescu
 Marcel Iancu
 Sorin Ilfoveanu
 Petre Iorgulescu-Yor
 Alexandru Istrati
 Ştefan Luchian
 Paul Neagu
 Romul Nuțiu
 Dimitrie Paciurea
 Neculai Păduraru
 Theodor Pallady
 Stefan Pelmus
 Dan Perjovschi
 Gheorghe Petrașcu
 Ștefan Râmniceanu
 Camil Ressu
 George Ștefănescu
 Eustațiu Stoenescu
 Ion Theodorescu-Sion
 Nicolae Tonitza
 Ion Țuculescu
 Tristan Tzara
 Andra Ursuța

Romanian art
Romanian artists
Artists